Kanaranzi is an unincorporated community in Kanaranzi Township, Rock County, Minnesota, United States. Kanaranzi had a post office, which opened on December 30, 1886 and closed on July 4, 1992. In 2011, the Minnesota Department of Transportation estimated its population to be 70. Kanaranzi was platted in 1885, and named after nearby Kanaranzi Creek.

References

External links
HomeTownLocator Map of Kanaranzi, Minnesota

Unincorporated communities in Rock County, Minnesota
Unincorporated communities in Minnesota
Dakota toponyms
1885 establishments in Minnesota
Populated places established in 1885